Mike Lindstrom (born April 23, 1981 in Chilliwack, British Columbia) is a former professional Canadian football receiver who most recently played for the Edmonton Eskimos of the Canadian Football League. He was drafted by the BC Lions in the fifth round of the 2006 CFL Draft and spent that season on the practice roster before being released after the 2007 training camp.  He signed with the Edmonton Eskimos in August 2007.  He played CIS Football for the UBC Thunderbirds and was named to the Canada West All-Star and 2nd Team All-Canadian squads in 2005.  In 21 CIS games he recorded 84 receptions for 1,438 yards and 5 touchdowns.

References

1981 births
Living people
People from Chilliwack
UBC Thunderbirds football players
BC Lions players
Edmonton Elks players
Players of Canadian football from British Columbia
University of British Columbia alumni